Case Solvers is a company founded in September 2012 by Zsolt Ábrahám, Gergely Balázs and István Juhász. Case Solvers' mission is to train young problem solvers, and to create a platform between graduates and the actors of the Labor Market. The organization was originally called Hungarian Business Case Society until 2013. The team of 35 Hungarians had held more than 250 training sessions with university students across 27 countries by 2017.

History 
Case Solvers was initially founded as the Hungarian Business Case Society. The organization originally functioned as a blog where professional articles about case solving were published continually. The page, case-study.hu, aimed to spread case-solving as a teaching method among Hungarian and international business students as well.

HBCS held its first training at the College of Management (Hungary) in March 2013, which was soon followed by several case interview trainings. The team organized its first case study camp, the Case Camp, in August 2013. Within a year, Case Solvers held training courses in its home country's most prestigious business universities and prepared top teams for national and international case study competitions.

HBCS held its first training course as Case Solvers in November 2013, in India. The first training was soon followed by another in Romania, then another in the Netherlands. By 2017, Case Solvers held more than 250 trainings in 27 countries.

Case Solvers trainings in Hungary:

 Corvinus University of Budapest, Budapest, Hungary
 Budapest Business School, Budapest, Hungary
 University of Miskolc, Miskolc, Hungary
 University of Pécs, Pécs, Hungary

International Case Solvers trainings:

 Aalto University, Helsinki, Finland
 Babes-Bolyai University, Cluj-Napoca, Romania
 Caucasus University, Tbilisi, Georgia
 Charles University, Prague, Czech Republic
 Delhi University, New Delhi, India
 FGV São Paulo, São Paulo, Brazil
 University of Glasgow, Glasgow, United Kingdom
 Graduate Institute, Geneva, Switzerland
 HEC Paris, Paris, France
 Imperial College London, London, United Kingdom
 Indian Institute of Management Calcutta, Calcutta, India
 Koc University, Istanbul, Turkey
 London School of Economics and Political Sciences, London, UK
 NOVA School of Management, Lisbon, Portugal
 Partium Christian University, Oradea, Romania
 Rotterdam School of Management, Rotterdam, The Netherlands
 Sapientia University, Miercurea Ciuc, Romania
 Solvay Business School, Brussels, Belgium
 University of Cologne, Cologne, Germany
 University of Ljubljana, Ljubljana, Slovenia
 University of Oslo, Oslo, Norway
 University of Pretoria, Pretoria, South Africa
 University of Sao Paulo, Sao Paolo, Brazil
 University of St. Gallen, St. Gallen, Switzerland
 Warsaw School of Economics, Warsaw, Poland
 Buenos Aires, Argentina

Trainings 
One of the main activities of Case Solvers is training business students in case solving. There are two main groups of training: Case Solving Training and Case Interview Training.

Case-solving training 
Conventional case solving training, where problem solving, structured thinking and logical deduction are the obtainable skills. The case solver's task is to give a solution for an ill-structured, complex business problem, that they also need to present in front of a professional jury. Case Solvers hold trainings in several formats; from one afternoon, they can last up to a whole weekend. The amount and complexity of the material taught on trainings depends on the length of the training. Case Solvers often prepares teams for specific case competitions, both national and international ones.

Case-interview training 
Corporations, multinationals, and consulting firms are likely to choose between candidates based on case interviews. The point is that job candidates must find a solution to a problem during the interview, usually a real problem that the interviewer has already faced in the company. The case interviews are perfect for assessing the candidate's abilities. At certain companies, this is a key point in the recruitment process, therefore careful preparation is required from the applicant.

Case interview trainings by Case Solvers prepare for situations like this: students can learn the methods of case interviewing by professionals, who have already undergone similar situations and who are currently working in the most prestigious consulting firms or multinational companies themselves. Case Interview Training – similar to Case Solving – could last from just a half-day up to an entire weekend as well. The amount and complexity of the material taught depends on the length of the training.

Investment-banking training 
IB Day is about revealing the mystery of investment banks by showing training participants what they actually do, and how their recruitment and hiring processes work.

Case competitions 
In addition to preparing teams for national and international case competitions, Case Solvers also organizes its own competitions.

Case Solver of the Year ranking and competition 
The Case Solver of The Year Ranking (founded in 2013) aims to differentiate the case study competitions in Hungary and to make the competitor's performance measurable. The ranking is proposed to present the most successful competitors of the given year to the public, who are among Hungary's best case solvers based on their performance in case study competitions. The most prestigious case competitions of the academic year are the ones that matter in the Ranking.

Case Solver of the Year, the final competition organized by Case Solvers and Vialto Consulting is an invitational competition. The event aims to create a platform for the country's top case solvers where they can challenge themselves against the other outstanding students from the Case Solver of The Year Ranking. The contestant with the highest score gets a trophy for being the Case Solver of The Year.

Former case studies of the Case Solver of The Year Competition:

2014: Gránit Bank

2015: Budapesti Közlekedési Központ (Centre for Budapest Transport)

2016: Hungarian Telekom

2017: ENKSZ

Solvers’ Cup 
Solvers' Cup is Hungary's unique international case competition both as an invitational and online competition, which was first organized in 2016. The invitational part of Solvers' Cup, which included teams from Europe's top universities was held in Budapest, at the Corvinus University. Competitors were representatives of Consulting Clubs from for example Oxford and St. Gallen, as well as Czech, Austrian and Hungarian teams, among others. During the three-day event, participants had to provide a solution to a complex business problem followed by two rounds of presentations in front of the professional jury. Among the jury members we could find the dean of the Corvinus University and representatives of Loxon Solutions, DHL Consulting, Roland Berger, PwC, Philip Morris and Ringier Axel Springer.

Case Solvers created an online surface to give an opportunity for case solvers all over the world to join the contest. The 130 registered students had the same task as the invited competitors, but the case solving time was only 10 hours long for them. The online competition gave a chance to participate and to experience dynamic thinking and quick decision-making given the short deadline to all those who did not have the opportunity to compete personally in Budapest. Considering the first year's success, Case Solvers intends to organize Solvers' Cup every year from now on.

Research 
Case Solvers continuously publishes international research related to case solving and the expectations of the young generation at work. The research is aimed to inform the key actors of the labor market and to transfer their accumulated international knowledge.

Career ambitions report 
Case Solvers' team first published an English report – Career Ambitions Report – on career expectations of the young entrants of the labor market in March 2016. The survey is made up of three modules:

 How students collect information,
 how students evaluate information, and
 the key aspects of the students’ decision-making process.

The 2015 survey reflects the opinion of the youth interested in management consulting from six countries (Hungary, Romania, Switzerland, the Netherlands, India and Ukraine), while the report of 2016 was enlarged by university students of three other countries: Brazil, Argentina and the South African Republic.

Case study report 
Case competitions play an increasing role in the life of business students. The good results achieved in these competitions become an advantage when it comes to finding a job, especially in the consulting area. Case Solvers' research covers the current situation of the Hungarian case competitions, as well as the motivations and opinion of the participants.

The survey was based on interviews and questionnaires. Overall, it summarizes the opinion of more than a hundred university students. The main conclusions are the following: every year there are a significant increase in the number of case competitions in Hungary, and the main motivation of the competitors is to gain professional experience.

Corporate social responsibility 
Case Solvers placed great emphasis on the development of the Hungarian youth from the beginning. In December 2013, they co-founded the National Secondary School Problem Solving Contest (Országos Középiskolai Problémamegoldó Verseny) with Mathias Corvinus Collegium, and they launched the “Where to continue my studies?” (Hol tanuljak tovább?, HTT) initiative in November 2014. To support these projects, Problema Solvenda Foundation was established in January 2016 with the purpose of educating Hungarian high school students.

HTT program 
HTT is a non-profit project of Case Solvers that helps secondary school students make thoughtful decisions about their further studies. On the program's website, people with different fields of education and profession talk about their everyday working lives, bringing it closer to graduating students.

OKPV – National Secondary School Problem Solving Contest 
OKPV is a program for high school students that gives them an insight into the world of future academic case competitions. The task is problem solving of course, but the participants have to take on a historical figure’s character and make decisions with their minds. OKPV in 2017 is currently the fourth competition in a row in cooperation with Mathias Corvinus Collegium. With additional help from the Problema Solvenda Foundation, the competition is held in Slovenia, Romania and Ukraine as well.

References

Education companies of Hungary
Problem solving